Edgardo Antinori (born 22 December 1969) is an Argentine judoka. He competed in the men's lightweight event at the 1992 Summer Olympics.

References

External links
 

1969 births
Living people
Argentine male judoka
Olympic judoka of Argentina
Judoka at the 1992 Summer Olympics
Place of birth missing (living people)